On the early morning of August 11, 2009, the bodies of Zarema Sadulayeva and Alik Dzhabrailov were found in a car trunk on the outskirts of the Chechen Capital of Grozny. Their bodies had traces of many bullets.
Zarema Sadulayeva and Alik Dzhabrailov were kidnapped a day earlier, August 10 afternoon, from their work place, the office of non-profit organization Save the Generation, located in Grozny.

When the news of their abduction became known among human rights organizations, they at once raised alert to save them. The discovery of the bodies on the next day resulted in worldwide outcry among human rights defenders and politicians.

Victims 
Zarema Sadulayeva (born approx. 1976) and Alik (Umar) Lechayevich Dzhabrailov (born August 11, 1976) were newlyweds—their wedding took place a month before the murder. They were both 33 years old in August 2009. Zarema Sadulaeva ran the charity Save the Generation, which was helping children with injuries and disabilities receive treatment and education. Zarema Sadulaeva was from the village of Shalakhi, located near Grozny. A woman, being familiar with Zarema Sadulayeva, told the press on condition of anonymity that Sadulayeva was pregnant at the moment of the murder.
Alik Dzhabrailov, who shortly before the murder had sentenced to four years in prison for participating in hostilities, was released in early 2009 under an amnesty.

Save the Generation 
Zarema Sadulayeva was leading the Grozny office of the charity Save the Generation that was dedicated to help victims of war, including mine victims.
The Chechen charity, a nongovernmental organization, was founded in 2001 for psychological and physical rehabilitation to disabled children, orphans, and other victims of war. The group worked closely with UNICEF, for training about landmines, protection of the rights of the disabled. The charity was located in the centre of the City of the Grozny.

The only witness of abduction 

The only witness to the abduction, an employee of the charity Save the Generation, told about six unidentified persons, four of them were in camouflage clothes, two in civilian clothes. The unknown entered into the office of charity at 2 pm on August 10, 2009, and brought away Zarema Sadulayev and Alik Dzhabrailov. Then the abductors returned to the office to pick up the phones and the car that belonged to Zarema Sadulayeva and Alik Dzhabrailov. The kidnappers said they were from security services and had to took Zarema Sadulayeva and Alik Djabrailov away for questioning; the kidnappers left their telephone contact number. When Zarema Sadulayeva and Alek Dzabrailov's colleagues called the contact number left by the visitors then nobody answered them.

When the investigation was started, the single witness was taken under protection by the state due to fear for his life.

Searching for kidnapped 
The news of the abduction of Zarema Sadulayeva and Alik Dzhabrailov quickly spread among human rights activists, who gathered in the evening of 10 August at the police building in Grozny, where the parents of the abducted were summoned for questioning. Bodies with traces of bullet wounds were found the next day, in the early morning of August 11, 2009, in the Zavodskoy district of the city of Grozny, in the village of Chernorechye, in the trunk of a car that belonged to Alik Dzhabrailov.

Reaction of the Russian authorities 
The Head of the Chechen Republic Ramzan Kadyrov made a statement on August 11, 2009, about the murder that had taken place, that it was a challenge to the Chechen government and himself, and he demanded that the security forces solve this crime as soon as possible.

President Dmitry Medvedev ordered the Office of the Prosecutor General of the Russian Federation, Ministry of Internal Affairs and Federal Security Service to investigate the crime and find the killers. Medvedev also instructed the authorities of the Chechen Republic to provide any assistance to the federal authorities in the investigation of the crime.

International reaction

Investigation 

On August 11, 2009, Vladimir Markin, Russian Prosecutor General's Investigative Committee Spokesman, said about conducting investigation to determine all the circumstances of this incident as well as the perpetrators, and a group of experts from the Russian Prosecutor General's Investigative Committee has flown to the Grozny to help to solve the case.

On August 11, 2009, also Ramzan Kadyrov, Head of the Chechen Republic, said that the case is an inhuman crime and he would a take personal control of the investigation.

On 10 December 2009, Internet portal Caucasian Knot wrote that when the investigation in the murder had started, then colleagues of the killed human rights activists and friends criticized that, because the investigation had said Alik Djabrailov might be killed because he took part in a recent Chechen warfare, so, he might killed because of a feud after the warfare, but his wife was killed just incidentally, but the friends and colleagues argued that if that to be true, why then Zarema Sadulayeva body had such severe traces of torture.

On 15 July 2012, portal Caucasian Knot published interview with Human Rights Watch/Russia senior official, Tatiana Lokshina, where she said: "...one witness who saw the kidnappers was questioned by investigation, a facial composite was composed. The witness knew also telephone number of the one of those visitors. Then the investigation took two years with such witness' testimony to identify kidnapper. But when the one was identified, it occurred that the identified was a police officer in the Kurchaloy Police Office who died during one of the police special operations. So there is no more investigation to be leading by now." (This is a translation from Russian language; original quote see below in references.)

On January 22, 2015, investigative journalist Elena Milashina in the Novaya Gazeta wrote that the murder wasn't yet investigated: "...in Chechnya unknown kidnapped and killed human rights defender Natalya Estemirova, also civil activists Alik Djabrailov and Zarema Sadulayeva, as well as during a special security operation led by Ramzan Kadyrov another activist, Zarema Gaysanova, disappeared. Not a single one of the offences against the person that are severe and dangerous was investigated until today." (This is translation from Russian language; original quote see below in references.)

Memorial events

References

Unsolved murders in Russia
2009 murders in Russia
Murder of Zarema Sadulayeva and Alik Dzhabrailov
Murder in Chechyna